The  (LHD) is a fusion research device in Toki, Gifu, Japan, belonging to the National Institute for Fusion Science.
It is the second largest superconducting stellarator in the world, after the Wendelstein 7-X.
The LHD employs a heliotron magnetic field originally developed in Japan.

The objective of the project is to conduct fusion plasma confinement research in a steady state in order to elucidate possible solutions to physics and engineering problems in helical plasma reactors. The LHD uses neutral beam injection, ion cyclotron radio frequency (ICRF), and electron cyclotron resonance heating (ECRH) to heat the plasma, much like conventional tokamaks.

History
 Design finalized 1987
 Start of construction 1990
 Plasma operations from 1998
Neutral beam injection of 3 MW was used in 1999.
In 2005 it maintained a plasma for 3,900 seconds.
 In 2006 a new helium cooler was added. Using the new cooler, by 2018 a total of 10 long term operations have been achieved, reaching a maximum power level of 11.833 kA.
 To aid public acceptance, an exhaust system was designed to catch and filter the radioactive tritium the fusion process produces.

See also
 Fusion reactor
 National Institutes of Natural Sciences, Japan

References

External links
 Large Helical Device Website  good diagrams (worth archiving page)
 Super Dense Core plasmas in LHD. Harris. 2008 16 slides. advanced - inc ballooning mode and future development options

Fusion power
Stellarators
Toki, Gifu